Associazione Sportiva Dilettantistica Pol. Sarnese Calcio or simply Sarnese is an Italian association football club, based in Sarno, Campania. Sarnese currently plays in Serie D.

History

Foundation 
The club was founded in 1926.

From Promozione to Serie D 
From 2009–10 season to 2010–11 Sarnese has achieved two successive promotions in two years, before it was promoted from Promozione Campania to Eccellenza Campania and in the following year to Serie D.

Refoundation 
In summer 2013 the club wasn't able to enter 2013–14 Serie D and restarting from Eccellenza.

Colors and badge 
The team's color is grenadine.

Football clubs in Campania
Association football clubs established in 1926
1926 establishments in Italy